Johnby is a hamlet in the Eden District, in the English county of Cumbria. The B5305 road, the B5288 road, the A66 road and the M6 motorway are all nearby. Circa 1870, it had a population of 92 as recorded in the Imperial Gazetteer of England and Wales.

To the south of the hamlet is Johnby Hall, a fortified house or peel tower dating probably from the 14th Century, with alterations and extensions in every century since.

See also

Listed buildings in Greystoke, Cumbria

References

External links

  Cumbria County History Trust: Greystoke (nb: provisional research only - see Talk page)
 johnbyhall.co.uk

Hamlets in Cumbria
Greystoke, Cumbria
Inglewood Forest